Judy Hofflund is a US film producer. She worked at Creative Artists Agency and became assistant to CAA President Ron Meyer.

In 2013, it was published that after three decades in the representation business, she will be leaving showbiz.

In 2018, she took part in the campaign "Shoot'em with a Camera, Not a Gun" to save grizzly bears from being hunted in Wyoming.

Filmography
She was a producer in all films unless otherwise noted.

Film

Thanks

Television

References

External links 
 

American women artists
American women film producers
English-language film directors
Living people
Place of birth missing (living people)
Year of birth missing (living people)
21st-century American women